Nakgasan is a mountain in Incheon, South Korea. It sits on the island of Seongmodo in the county of Ganghwa.

See also
 List of mountains in Korea

Notes

References
 

Mountains of South Korea